Graphogaster brunnescens is a European species of fly in the family Tachinidae.

References

Tachininae
Diptera of Europe
Insects described in 1907
Taxa named by Joseph Villeneuve de Janti